Peter Damian Williams is an Australian author and military historian. He was born in Hobart in 1957 and educated at St Virgil's College. He taught history in the Northern Territory and Japan and now lives in Canberra. Peter Williams holds the degrees of BA, Dip. Ed, MA and PhD.

Publications 
 A Ridge Too Far, Gallipoli supplement, Sydney Morning Herald, 25 April 2004.
 The Ottoman artillery bombardment at Gallipoli, Wartime, magazine of the Australian War Memorial, no. 34, 2005
  The Japanese 18th Army in New Guinea, Wartime, magazine of the Australian War Memorial, no. 36, 2006
 An Imperial Japanese Navy pilot in New Guinea, Headmark, Journal of the Australian Naval Institute, no. 125, 2007
 Zero Hours, Australian Warship, no. 38, 2007
 The Battle of Anzac Ridge, 25 April 1915, Australian Military History Publications, 2008
 Canakkale Savasi Kanlisirt Muharebesi, 25 Nisan 1915, Kitap Yayinevi, Istanbul, 2009
  The Kokoda Track, Exploring the site of the battle fought by Australians in WWII, Department of Veterans' Affairs, 2010
 Australia’s Involvement in the Korean War, Department of Veterans' Affairs, 2011
 Kokoda, exploring the Second World War Campaign in Papua New Guinea, (educational resource) Department of Veterans' Affairs, 2011
  The Kokoda Campaign 1942, Myth and Reality, Cambridge University Press, Melbourne, 2012
  Kokoda for Dummies, Wiley and Sons, Melbourne, 2012
  Japan's Pacific War: Personal Accounts of the Emperor's Warriors, Pen and Sword, Barnsley, 2021

References 

1957 births
Living people
Australian military historians